Zak Lee-Green (born 5 February 1991) is a retired Welsh and British rower.

Rowing career
Lee-Green from Cardiff, was initially selected for the Welsh squad before winning a bronze medal for Great Britain at the 2010 World Rowing U23 Championships. He made his senior British team debut at the 2014 World Rowing Cup. He won a silver medal at the 2017 World Rowing Championships in Sarasota, Florida, as part of the lightweight quadruple sculls with Edward Fisher, Gavin Horsburgh and Peter Chambers. He retired from competitive rowing in 2020.

References

Living people
1991 births
British male rowers
Welsh male rowers
World Rowing Championships medalists for Great Britain